Lumā is a village on the northwest coast of Taʻū Island in American Samoa, south of the village of Taʻū and north of Siʻufaga. The last Tui Manuʻa is buried in Lumā. It is also where anthropologist Margaret Mead researched and authored her classic Coming of Age in Samoa in 1925. Lumā and neighboring Siʻufaga are subvillages of the Village of Taʻū.

The main settlement on Taʻū Island is based around the twin villages of Lumā and Siʻufaga. The Taʻū Motel is located near the small boat harbor in Lumā, known as Lumā Harbor. The harbor is mostly used by local fishing boats, and is not recommended for yachts.

Demographics

Geography
It is located in Taʻū County in the Manuʻa District on Taʻū. It is bounded by one side by the Pacific Ocean and a jungle hill known as Tunoa Ridge on the other. It mostly consists of clapboard and stucco bungalows roofed with corrugated iron. Lumā is home to two large churches and one shop. It is 70 miles of ocean from the territorial capital of Pago Pago.

Margaret Mead

Anthropologist Margaret Mead traveled from Pago Pago to Lumā in 1925. The 24 year-old Mead stayed in the village for half a year while doing fieldwork such as interviewing villagers. She complained of the heat that made it impossible for her to work several hours at midday. This is also where she wrote her classic anthropological work Coming of Age in Samoa (1925). Later, a devastating hurricane left just a few houses standing in the village, and prevented Mead from interviewing villagers for several weeks.

References

Villages in American Samoa